is a railway station on the Shinetsu Main Line in the city of Jōetsu, Niigata, Japan, operated by East Japan Railway Company (JR East).

Lines
Katamachi Station is served by the Shin'etsu Main Line, and is 11.2 kilometers from the terminus of the line at Naoetsu Station.

Station layout
The station consists of two opposed side platforms, connected by a footbridge. The station is unattended.

Platforms

History
The station opened on 13 May 1897. With the privatization of Japanese National Railways (JNR) on 1 April 1987, the station came under the control of JR East.

Passenger statistics
In fiscal 2016, the station was used by an average of 178 passengers daily (boarding passengers only).

Surrounding area
former Katamachi town hall
 Katamachi Post Office
Japan National Route 8

See also
 List of railway stations in Japan

References

External links

 JR East station information 

Railway stations in Niigata Prefecture
Railway stations in Japan opened in 1897
Stations of East Japan Railway Company
Shin'etsu Main Line
Jōetsu, Niigata